Sarsar or Sar Sar may refer to:
 Sarsar, Bibalan, Rudsar County, Gilan Province
 Sar Sar, Machian, Rudsar County, Gilan Province
 Sarsar, Kohgiluyeh and Boyer-Ahmad